The 1995 Copa CONMEBOL Finals were the final match series to decide the winner of the 1995 Copa CONMEBOL, a continental cup competition organised by CONMEBOL. The final was contested by Argentine club Rosario Central and Brazilian Clube Atlético Mineiro.

Played under a two-legged tie system, Atlético Mineiro won the first leg held in Mineirão Stadium in Minas Gerais, while Rosario Central won the second leg at Estadio Gigante de Arroyito. As both matches had similar scores (4–0), a penalty shoot-out was carried out to decide a champion. Rosario Central won 4–3 on penalties, thus the club from Rosario achieved its first international title.

The performance of Rosario Central was highly praised by the Argentine media, which recognised how the team overcame to the big defeat in the first leg to force a penalty shoot out and finally to win the Cup. "Huge achievement" was the most used term for that victory, which is regarded by Rosario Central fans as one of their greatest achievements ever.

Qualified teams

Venues

Road to the final 

Notes
 QF = quarterfinal
 SF = semifinal

Match details

First leg

Second leg

See also
 1995 Copa CONMEBOL

References

Rosario Central matches
Clube Atlético Mineiro matches
Copa CONMEBOL Finals
1995 in Argentine football
1995 in Brazilian football
Copa CONMEBOL Finals 1995